FC Ak-Bura Osh is a Kyrgyzstani football club based in Osh, Kyrgyzstan that plays in the top division in Kyrgyzstan, the Kyrgyzstan League.  The club plays its home games at Suyumbayev Stadion.

External links 
Career stats by KLISF

Football clubs in Kyrgyzstan
Osh